Line 3 of Hefei Metro is a metro line in Hefei. The line opened on 26 December 2019.

Opening timeline

Stations

Future Development
A southern extension was approved by the NDRC. The extension is 11.25 km in length.

References

03
2019 establishments in China
Railway lines opened in 2019